Robert Landesmann (26 March 1912 – 26 February 1986) was a French wrestler. He competed in the men's freestyle light heavyweight at the 1948 Summer Olympics.

References

External links
 

1912 births
1986 deaths
French male sport wrestlers
Olympic wrestlers of France
Wrestlers at the 1948 Summer Olympics
Sportspeople from Paris